Jean-Claude Pierre-Louis was the Chief Executive of Rodrigues Island, Mauritius between October 24, 2004 and March 2010.

Pierre-Louis was the second person to hold the title since it was created in 2002. He had threaten to quit after a dispute with Chief Commissioner of Rodrigues Johnson Roussety

References

Year of birth missing (living people)
Living people
Chief Executives of Rodrigues
Rodrigues politicians
Mauritian politicians
People from Rodrigues
Mauritian Creoles